How Fascism Works: The Politics of Us and Them is a 2018 nonfiction book by Jason Stanley, the Jacob Urowsky Professor of Philosophy at Yale University. Stanley, whose parents were refugees of Nazi Germany, describes strategies employed by fascist regimes, which includes normalizing the "intolerable". His book is part of a "wave of articles, books and op-eds" that warn of the "return of fascism", features of which are already evident, according to Stanley, in the politics of the United States, the Philippines, Brazil, Russia, and Hungary.
The book was reissued in 2020 with a new preface in which Stanley describes how global events have substantiated his concern that fascist rhetoric is showing up in politics and policies around the world.

Content

Stanley focuses on rhetoric and propaganda. His previous books include Knowledge and Practical Interests, Language in Context, Know How and the award-winning How Propaganda Works. He is a witness to the "consequences of fascism", his parents having fled Germany during the Holocaust. His maternal aunts, uncles and cousins were killed in eastern Poland in 1941 during Hitler's invasion. Stanley identifies the pillars of fascist politics that deepen the divide between "us" and "them"—denying equality, using a culture of victimhood, and feeding the sexual anxiety of men. Strategies include undermining journalists and reporters, promoting anti-intellectualism, the use of propaganda, spreading conspiracy theories, letting fear and anger overtake "reasoned debate", and then calling on "law and order" solutions. Stanley describes how one of the hallmarks of fascism is the "politics of hierarchy"—a belief in a biologically determined superiority—whereby fascists strive to recreate a "mythic" and "glorious" past by excluding those they believe to be inferior because of their ethnicity, religion, and/or race.

Reviews
According to a New York Times review, Stanley's book—a "slim volume"—"breezes across decades and continents" and says that Donald Trump "resembles other purveyors of authoritarian ultranationalism." Overall, the Times gave a mixed review.

The New Yorker said that How Fascism Works was popular, even though it was by an "academic philosopher"—it "prioritized current events over syllogisms" and "ranged broadly, citing experimental psychology, legal theory, and neo-Nazi blogs."

The Guardians "rave review" cited Stanley who said that, one of the "ironies of fascist politics" is that it includes the "normalization of the fascist myth" so that talk of fascism is made to appear to be "outlandish". Fascist politics makes us able to "tolerate what was once intolerable by making it seem as if this is the way things have always been.... By contrast the word 'fascist' has acquired a feeling of the extreme, like 'crying wolf'."

The Times Literary Supplement (TLS), which gave the book a mixed review, said that How Fascism Works belongs to a "wave of articles, books and op-eds" that warn us of the "return of fascism"—which includes Fascism: A Warning by Madeleine Albright, On Tyranny by Timothy Snyder, When The Mob Gets Swayed with contributions by Paul Neuborn, and The Dangerous Case of Donald Trump with contributions by John Gartner. Stanley said in his book that a number of countries—the Philippines, Rwanda, Myanmar, Brazil, Russia, Hungary, Poland and the United States—have currently been "affected by fascist politics".

References

External links
 Interview with the author on the book

2018 non-fiction books
Random House books
Books about fascism